China National Highway 323 (G323) runs southwest from Ruijin, Jiangxi towards Guangdong Province, Guangxi Province, and ends in Lincang, Yunnan, which is on China-Myanmar border. It is 2,915 kilometres in length.

Route and distance

See also 

 China National Highways

Transport in Jiangxi
Transport in Guangdong
Transport in Guangxi
Transport in Yunnan
323